Veneto is a region of northern Italy.

Veneto may also refer to:

People
 Armando Veneto, Italian politician
 Bartolomeo Veneto, Italian painter

Military
 Italian battleship Vittorio Veneto
 Italian cruiser Vittorio Veneto (550)
 Battle of Vittorio Veneto, 1918
 159th Infantry Division Veneto, World War II

Sport
 Eccellenza Veneto, an Italian football division
 Giro del Veneto, an Italian bicycle race

Other uses
 Veneto-, a prefix used when referring to either Venice or Veneto, as in "Veneto–Greek"
 Ateneo Veneto, an institution
 Atlante Veneto, an atlas
 Together for Veneto, a political coalition
 Veneto wine
 Via Veneto, a street in Rome

See also
 
 
Veneta (disambiguation)
 Veneti (disambiguation)